Group 8 of the 2017 UEFA European Under-21 Championship qualifying competition consisted of five teams: Netherlands, Slovakia, Turkey, Belarus, and Cyprus. The composition of the nine groups in the qualifying group stage was decided by the draw held on 5 February 2015.

The group was played in home-and-away round-robin format. The group winners qualified directly for the final tournament, while the runners-up advanced to the play-offs if they were one of the four best runners-up among all nine groups (not counting results against the sixth-placed team).

Standings

Matches
Times are CEST (UTC+2) for dates between 29 March and 24 October 2015 and between 27 March and 29 October 2016, for other dates times are CET (UTC+1).

Goalscorers
6 goals

 Vincent Janssen

5 goals

 Adam Zreľák

4 goals

 Martin Chrien

3 goals

 Pavel Savitski
 Jaroslav Mihalík
 Albert Rusnák

2 goals

 Riechedly Bazoer
 Steven Bergwijn
 Matúš Bero
 Pavol Šafranko

1 goal

 Vladislav Klimovich
 Gleb Rassadkin
 Yevgeniy Yablonskiy
 Yaroslav Yarotsky
 Minas Antoniou
 Nicholas Ioannou
 Fanos Katelaris
 Andreas Makris
 Donny van de Beek
 Jean-Paul Boëtius
 Anwar El Ghazi
 Hans Hateboer
 Derrick Luckassen
 Stanislav Lobotka
 Milan Škriniar
 Kaan Ayhan
 Bilal Başaçıkoğlu
 Oğulcan Çağlayan
 Kenan Karaman
 Cenk Şahin

1 own goal

 Stefanos Mouhtaris (against Turkey)
 Matúš Hruška (against Turkey)

References

External links
Standings and fixtures at UEFA.com

Group 8